The history of Football Club Matera has covered 82 years of the football from the club based in Matera, Basilicata. It was a professional Italian football club, founded in 1930. Since 2012 the club is definitely excluded from Italian football. 

The last president was Tommaso Perniola.

From 1930 to 2012

F.C. Matera

Foundation
The club was founded in 1930.

Serie B
Matera has been as high as Serie B, playing in the second division for one season in 1979/1980 during the presidency of senator Francesco Salerno.

The last three seasons 
It won the 2009–10 Coppa Italia Serie D and the promotion playoffs in 2009-10 Serie D, and was admitted to 2010-11 Lega Pro Seconda Divisione where it ranks 7th.

In summer 2011, it does not appeal against the exclusion of Covisoc and was relegated to Terza Categoria where it was ranked 3rd.

Following the foundation of the new Matera Calcio the club does not join 2012–13 championship and so was excluded from Italian football.

Colors and badge 
Its colors are white and blue.

Stadium 
It played at the Stadio XXI Settembre-Franco Salerno, in Matera, which has a capacity of 8,500.

Notable former players

 Luigi De Canio
 Francesco Mancini
 Dragutin Ristić
 Fernando Veneranda

The football in Matera now

Matera Calcio 
The main team of the town of Matera is Matera Calcio, which relocated from nearby town Irsina until it folded in 2019.

Honours
 Coppa Italia Serie D
 Winners: 2009–10

References

Defunct football clubs in Italy
FC